Samuel Peto can refer to:
 Samuel Petto (c.1624-1711), English Puritan clergyman
 Samuel Morton Peto (1809-1889),  English entrepreneur, civil engineer and railway developer